G. W. Goethals may refer to:

George Washington Goethals (1858-1928), a United States Army officer and civil engineer
USS General G. W. Goethals (ID-1443), a United States Navy cargo ship and troop transport in commission in 1919